During the 2002–03 in Spanish football season, Málaga competed in La Liga.

Season summary
Málaga slipped to 13th in the final table, but won the Intertoto Cup and reached the quarter-finals of the UEFA Cup. Manager Joaquín Peiró left at the end of the season.

First-team squad
Squad at end of season

Left club during season

Results

UEFA Cup

First round

Second round

Málaga won 4–2 on aggregate.

Third round

Málaga won 2–1 on aggregate.

Fourth round

Málaga won 1–0 on aggregate.

Quarter-finals

1–1 on aggregate. Boavista won 4–1 on penalties.

References

Málaga CF seasons
Malaga CF